Salvatoria is a genus of polychaetes belonging to the family Syllidae.

The genus has cosmopolitan distribution.

Species:
Grubea protandrica 
Salvatoria alvaradoi 
Salvatoria balani 
Salvatoria californiensis 
Salvatoria celiae 
Salvatoria clavata 
Salvatoria concinna 
Salvatoria euritmica 
Salvatoria heterocirra 
Salvatoria kerguelensis 
Salvatoria koorineclavata 
Salvatoria limbata 
Salvatoria longisetosa 
Salvatoria mediodentata 
Salvatoria neapolitana 
Salvatoria nutrix 
Salvatoria opisthodentata 
Salvatoria pilkena 
Salvatoria quadrioculata 
Salvatoria rhopalophora 
Salvatoria swedmarki 
Salvatoria tenuicirrata 
Salvatoria vieitezi 
Salvatoria yraidae

References

Polychaete genera
Syllidae